Mazghuna (also known as Al Mazghunah or Al-Muzghumah), 5 km to the south of Dahshur, is the site of several mudbrick pyramids dating from the 12th Dynasty. The area was explored by Ernest Mackay in 1910, and was excavated by Flinders Petrie in 1911. Amenemhat IV and Sobekneferu have been suggested as the owners of two unfinished pyramids at Mazghuna, but there is no conclusive evidence of this. The southern pyramid is about 3 miles from Sneferu's Bent pyramid. The base was 52.5 meters square but it was never finished. The outer burial chamber contains an inner monolithic burial vault made out of quartzite like the one for Amenemhat III at Hawara. There was a large granite plug ready to slide over the top however it was never used since no one was ever buried there.

There was a second pyramid planned at north Mazghuna even larger than this one but the superstructure was never begun. There was a U shaped passage leading to the burial chamber which contains another monolithic burial vault. There was scarcely 2 cm (less than 1 inch) clearance between the vault and the chamber. There was a 42-ton quartzite slab waiting to be slid over the burial chamber.

In fiction 
The Amelia Peabody mystery The Mummy Case (by Elizabeth Peters) was set in Mazghuna.

See also 
Northern Mazghuna pyramid
Southern Mazghuna pyramid
List of megalithic sites

References

Further reading 
W.M.F. Petrie, G.A. Wainwright, E. Mackay, The Labyrinth, Gerzeh and Mazghuneh. London 1912

External links 
 The Muzghuna Pyramids

Archaeological sites in Egypt